Molana Azizullah Bohio (14 March 1946 – 2 November 2021) was a Pakistani religious scholar and politician from Sindh and was a Sindhi independence activist, Islamic theologian, writer and a senior leader of the Sindh Sagar Party who struggled for an exploitation-free society in Sindh.

Early life and education 
Bohio was born on 14 March 1946. He got his formal education at his village school and then several other religious schools. Raised in the small village of Khair Muhammad Bohio near the city district Naushahro Feroze Sindh, Bohio was a highly qualified religious scholar and was the author of several books about Religion, Politics and Islamic History and multiple other issues.

Political career 
Bohio was completely devoted to Sindh in spite of being a religious man. He was a member of Jamiat Ulema-e-Islam (JUI) also with Mufti Mehmood late 1980.But when Mufti declared Pakistan Army`s operation right over Bangladesh and several other issues about Sindh cause including future of Sindhi language in Pakistan, water, other resources, people coming from other provinces to Sindh he left JUI because Mufti failed to satisfy him.He then started his own party named "Sindh Sagar Party" with his other religious friends (of which he was the founder) and remained Chairman of that party (a political party belonging to the region of Sindh) until his death.Although he was always active for rights of labour, he remained Secretary General of Pakistan Oppressed Nations Movement (PONM) Sindh Chapter. His son was kidnapped while working as the leader of PONM. He struggled against Water Shortage in Sindh and demanded no more Dams on Indus river. He struggled for the rights of minorities, Oppressed Nations, labor and farmers. He was against the conversion of Hindu-girls for marriage.

Critical points of view 
Bohio was the strict opposite and critic of religious extremism. For that reason, he had advised his relatives to bury him in the graveyard of non-Muslims so that the difference of Muslims and non-Muslims can be decreased in Sindh, which became a warm debate in Religious and Social platforms during his death days. Bohio was against the wrong definers of Islam for that he faced many oppositions by religious forums for his critical points of views about Islamic Ethics and beliefs described in his books. He believed that early Muslim governments were not faithful to Islam because many things which were prescribed, their actual propose is varied by them for their vested interests, including specially the age of Prophet Muhammad, which is according to Quran one hundred and twenty three he believed. He also challenged to whole Muslim scholars that the word "Salah" which is mentioned seven hundred times in Quran is not for an individual prayer named Namaz,which is a Persian word which means Fire worship. But word Salah is ordered for an aggregate action as an organization, Unity or gathering of public for improving people's social, political, personal and economic problems. His two books "Islamic History according to Quran" and " Difference in Salah and Namaz according to Quran" are an open challenge to Islamic literature but no written objection or reply was published in his life for which he waited till his death.

Books and publications 
Bohio was a highly qualified religious scholar and was the author of fifty two books about Religion, Politics and Islamic History and multiple other issues. His articles were being published in newspapers and magazines. His ever popular book about the Sindh Punjab water dispute "Water according to Quran" was considered to be a strong reference material about this issue. "Islamic History according to Quran" is also his outstanding work about Islamic history. All his books were published by "Sindh Sagar Acadmey". Quranic Political Science, Socialism, Secularism and Nationalism Taught by Islam, Crualities of Experts of Hadith Upon Quran, Ahsan ul Hadith(3 Volumes), Water according to Quran, Islamic History According to Quran.

Azizullah Bohio's Sindhi Books published by Sindh Sagar Academy 
Quran Mahjoor 

Ayat-e-Bayanat

Quran jo Farman 

Quran Khan siwai kinh ji bh tabedari na kayo 

Fitrat ji Boli

Salwat aeen Nimaz main Firq 

Fitna Inkar Quran kian aeen Kadhin 

Allah ji Ibadat Kian aeen Kadhin Kajy 

Ahsan-ul-Hadees 

Islami Tareekh Quran ji Roshni main 

Quran Panjho Tafseer Pan Kary tho 

Fiqh Quran 

Salf Salhin ji Nalin Saan Ilm main Khayanatoon

Azizullah Bohio’s Urdu Books published by Sindh Sagar Academy 
Mujzaat 

Vijood bary Talaa

Vildiyat wo Vifate Eissa 

Kia Humary Nimazin Quran Silwaat hain 

Misjid Quran Ki nazr main 

Mard aur aurat ki barbry 

Kia un ka lia quran kafi nahi 

Kia ilm hadees quran ki tafseer kar sakta ha 

Quran kaswati ha, apny nazryat us ka zarye dursat karo 

Quran mazloom ki faryad 

Qurani Salwat 

Quran par hamla 

Quran fahmi ka khilaf sazish 

Quran ka falsifa 

Faisla Ap Karin, Kia Salwat ka tarjuma Nimaz hosakta ha 

Quran Aik ha 

Shah wali-ul-Allah Quran ka aeeny main 

Haqeet Soom Quran ki Roshni main

Arabi Madaris ka nisab-e-Taleem Khilaf Quran ha 

Secularism aur do Qoumi Nazriya, Quran ki nazr main 

Rooh Quran Iqwam Europe li ureen 

Raiwind ki mati se aalmi saamraj ka inteqam 

Khilaf Quran Iloom 

Din Quran se kiun nahi laity 

Hukum Quran Aqeemo Salwat ki manwi tareef 

Hukoomat Saudia waida maaf gawah 

Haqeeqat Soom Quran ki Roshni main 

Hujat Quran ha 

Fiqh-ul-Quran 

Arabi Maheeny Shamsi Calender Ka mutabiq 

Aurat ka maqam Quran ka aeeny main 

Salwat aur nimaz main firq 

Salwat ki wo maana jo quran na batai 

Tuheen-e-Risaalat nami Qanoon se Spain ki tareekh duhrai ja rahi ha 

Tareekh main muslim umat ka ander saamraj ka kai sary “Daeesh” Misl 

Tabsra Miraj ki sawari 

Tareekh Islam ka Quran aeeny main 

Pahly Quran ko zahno main any do 

Imami Uloom aur Quran 

Umat Muslima ka Shaoor ki khidmat main appeal 

Islah Ka amal pahly apny ap se Shru Kia jai

Fitna Inkar Quran

Death 
Bohio died from heart disease on 2 November 2021, at the age of 75. His death was considered amongst Sindhi writers, Literates, Civil society, Nationalists and Religious scholars a great loss by critics.

Critical appreciation 
People believe that he was not only a religious personality but a Comrade also. His death was considered amongst Sindhi writers, Literates, Civil society, Nationalists and Religious scholars a great loss to Sindh by critics. He was inspired by Molana Abul Kalam and Ubaidullah Sindhi. He is believed to be the "Imam ul Sindh" of the modern era to his followers.

References 

1946 births
2021 deaths
Pakistani scholars
Pakistani writers
People from Naushahro Feroze District